The Allen Americans are a professional ice hockey team headquartered at the Credit Union of Texas Event Center in Allen, Texas, which currently plays in the ECHL. The team was founded in 2009 in the Central Hockey League (CHL) where they played for five seasons, winning the Ray Miron President's Cup twice. The CHL folded in 2014 and the ECHL accepted the remaining CHL teams as members for the 2014–15 season. In their first two seasons in the ECHL, Allen advanced to the Kelly Cup finals, winning the championship in both years. The team is led by President Jonny Mydra and head coach/general manager Chad Costello. Currently, the Americans are affiliated with the National Hockey League's Ottawa Senators and the American Hockey League's Belleville Senators.

History

Expansion and the CHL years
On April 15, 2009, the Central Hockey League announced an expansion team for Allen, to begin play in the 2009–10 season. The new team was owned by Top Shelf, LLC, a group consisting of EXCO Resources chairman Douglas H. Miller and former NHL defenseman Steve Duchesne. That same day, the team announced an affiliation with the NHL's Dallas Stars. Through this affiliation, they also affiliated with the Austin-based AHL Texas Stars.

On April 27, 2009, the ownership group unveiled the team's name, logo, and colors. On May 12, 2009, the Americans announced Dwight Mullins as their inaugural head coach, along with Bill MacDonald as assistant coach and head of hockey operations.

As construction on the Allen Event Center would not be completed in time for the beginning of the CHL season, Allen began the season with a seven-game road streak, winning five, including their first ever game against the Arizona Sundogs 1–0, on a first period Christian Gaudet power play goal. The first game on home ice was not until November 7, 2009, a 4–1 loss to the Corpus Christi IceRays in front of a sellout crowd of 5,808 people.

Allen advanced to the playoffs as the number two seed in the Southern Conference in their first season, defeating both the Laredo Bucks and number one seed Odessa Jackalopes in seven games. In the Ray Miron President's Cup finals, they took a 2–1 series lead over the Rapid City Rush, but lost three straight games, losing the series 4–2.

Allen also qualified for the playoffs in the following two seasons, winning the Bud Poile Governors’ Cup regular season title in only their second season in the league. They lost in the conference finals to eventual champions, the Bossier-Shreveport Mudbugs, in 2011, and had a disappointing first round exit to bitter rivals the Texas Brahmas in 2012.

Prior to the Americans third season, on September 1, 2011, it was announced that the Americans signed a one-year affiliation deal with the Colorado Avalanche of the NHL and by extension the Lake Erie Monsters of the AHL. This agreement officially made the Americans affiliates of the Avalanche after having a working relationship with the Monsters over the previous two years. This affiliation is no longer in place as Colorado and Lake Erie moved their affiliation to the now defunct Denver Cutthroats organization.

On May 4, 2012, the Allen Americans announced that former Dallas Stars Mike Modano, Craig Ludwig, and Ed Belfour partnered up to become minority owners of Top Shelf, LLC. Shortly after, the Allen Americans announced that they would not retain GM and head coach Dwight Mullins, along with associate coach Bill McDonald. Richard Matvichuk was then announced as the assistant general manager and defensive coach. A month later, the Americans announced Steve Martinson as their new head coach.

After winning their second Bud Poile Governor's Cup regular season title, the Allen Americans went on to win the Ray Miron President's Cup for the first time on May 11, 2013, in front of a sold out crowd. After falling behind 2–0 in the first two periods of game seven against the Wichita Thunder, Allen scored two third period goals to tie the game. In overtime, Todd Robinson scored the winner to give Allen their first championship win.

On May 10, 2014, the Allen Americans became only the third CHL team to win back-to-back Ray Miron President's Cup championships, and the first since the Memphis RiverKings achieved the feat in 2003. Allen scored four second period goals to defeat the Denver Cutthroats 5–2, winning the finals series four games to one in front of a sold out crowd. Less than a week later, the Americans were sold by the Top Shelf ownership group to Stevens Brothers Sports Management, LLC. The Stevens Brothers also owned the CHL's Tulsa Oilers and Wichita Thunder.

Move to the ECHL
On October 7, 2014, soon before the 2014–15 Central Hockey League season was set to begin, it was announced that the Central Hockey League ceased operations and the Americans, along with the Brampton Beast, Quad City Mallards, Missouri Mavericks, Rapid City Rush, Tulsa Oilers and Wichita Thunder, were all approved the expansion membership application into the ECHL for the 2014–15 season. On October 14, 2014, the Americans announced their affiliation with the San Jose Sharks and Worcester Sharks (and later the San Jose Barracuda).

The Americans finished its inaugural ECHL season atop the Central Division which encompassed the former CHL members, having the second-best overall regular-season performance and the best offense in the league, with 192 goals. During the 2015 playoffs, they beat both the Tulsa Oilers and Rapid City Rush to reach the Western Conference Finals against the Ontario Reign. The Americans would win the first game before losing the following three games to the Reign. The Americans would come back to win the following three games in order to clinch the series. They were the fifth team in ECHL postseason history to win a series after trailing 3-games-to-1. On June 14, 2015, the Americans defeated the South Carolina Stingrays in seven games to win their first Kelly Cup. They are the first team to advance to and win the Kelly Cup in their first ECHL season since the Idaho Steelheads accomplished the feat in 2004.

Allen finished its second season in the ECHL in second place in the newly reorganized Central Division, behind the Brabham Cup champions Missouri Mavericks, earning the number four seed in the Western Conference. After trailing 3-games-to-2 in the opening series with the Idaho Steelheads, Allen forced a game seven at home, with Tristan King scoring the series-winning goal in overtime. The Americans went on to defeat number one seed Missouri by 4-games-to-2, and retain the Western Conference championship, defeating the number two seed Fort Wayne Komets by 4-games-to-1, becoming the first team to make back-to-back trips to the ECHL finals since 1994, and the first-ever since the switch from the Riley Cup to the Kelly Cup. Allen then became the first team since the Toledo Storm in 1994 to win consecutive ECHL championships, by defeating the Wheeling Nailers 4-games-to-2, celebrating their fourth consecutive championship across two leagues on home ice on June 9, 2016.

On February 23, 2017, the ECHL announced that the Americans had been sold by the Stevens brothers to Allen Hockey Team, LLC, led by Reading Royals' owner Jack Gulati. As part of the transition, Gulati planned to rebrand the team to be more inclusive of the Dallas-Fort Worth area while keeping the Americans name and keeping the team at the Allen Events Center. The organization held a name-the-team contest from March 31 to June 30, 2017, but nothing further was announced as of the end the 2017–18 season.

Following the 2018–19 season, the Americans missed the playoffs for the first time in franchise history. In July 2019, owner Gulati also announced that the team for sale before the 2019–20 season due to health issues in his family at the time and thought it would be better for the team to have local owners instead of an absentee owner. He also stated that if the team was not sold before the start of the season, he would not sell it during the season.

The Americans were again leading the division in the 2019–20 season with a 40–14–0–6 record before the season was cancelled due to the COVID-19 pandemic.  Steve Martinson was named General Manager of the Year, while defenseman Alex Breton and forward Tyler Sheehy were named to the All-ECHL First Team. The Americans were one of 14 ECHL teams to elect to play the pandemic-delayed 2020–21 season. They finished with the top seed in the Western Conference, but were eliminated by the Fort Wayne Komets in the conference finals of the 2021 Kelly Cup playoffs.

In the 2021–22 season, the Americans became the first ECHL affiliate of the NHL expansion team, the Seattle Kraken.
 	
On August 24th, 2022, the Americans announced they had reached a deal to become the new ECHL affiliate of the Ottawa Senators of the NHL and their AHL affiliate, the Belleville Senators.

Mascot
At the opening weekend of the 2010 season, the Americans introduced their mascot, Biscuit the American Bulldog, who wears the jersey number "K9".

Season-by-season records

Players

Current roster
Updated November 26, 2022.

References

External links
Allen Americans' official website

 
Central Hockey League teams
ECHL teams
Sports in Allen, Texas
Ice hockey teams in Texas
Ice hockey clubs established in 2009
2009 establishments in Texas
Minnesota Wild minor league affiliates
Ottawa Senators minor league affiliates
2
Seattle Kraken minor league affiliates